J. C. Wilson (born March 11, 1956) is a former American football cornerback. He played his entire six-year National Football League (NFL) career for the Houston Oilers.

References

1956 births
Living people
American football cornerbacks
Houston Oilers players
Pittsburgh Panthers football players
Players of American football from Cleveland